Alfie George Templeman (born 26 January 2003) is an English singer-songwriter, multi-instrumentalist and producer. In 2016, he began recording and releasing demos at the age of 13. Templeman made his professional solo debut in 2018 and has released four extended plays since then. He describes his sound as "indie R&B" and often draws inspiration from the experiences of others, such as characters from TV shows.

Early life
Templeman was born in Carlton, Bedfordshire. He cites the area as an influence on his music.

Templeman grew up around his father's collection of guitars and his sister, whose musical talents included playing the piano and trumpet. Templeman has stated this is what "[drew him] into the world of music".

At the age of seven, he developed an interest in drums and received his first guitar at age eight. Until then, he'd taught himself how to play his father's left-handed guitars upside down. Self-taught at everything apart from drums, Templeman began recording at home and making CDs with his friends at age ten. By the time he turned 13, he had already acquired a fair understanding of music production software on his own and began working on creating full-length tracks. His mother encouraged him to sing. Templeman transitioned from producing simple instrumentals to fully-formed compositions.

Career
In 2018, Templeman recorded and released his debut single "Orange Juice", followed soon after by his debut EP, Like an Animal, released in October 2018 by Chess Club Records. Templeman wrote, performed and recorded his debut EP Like an Animal in his bedroom after school. Before signing with Chess Club, Templeman would upload his music on Spotify and was noticed when he featured on their "Discover Weekly" playlist.

After completing his GCSEs, Templeman left high school in 2019 at 16 years old to pursue a full-time music career.

Following the success of his debut, Templeman released his second EP, Sunday Morning Cereal, in June 2019 and his third EP, Don't Go Wasting Time, later that same year.

In April 2019, Templeman performed at the O2 Academy Brixton supporting Sundara Karma and has also supported Sports Team on their UK tour and played the Five Day Forecast and Eurosonic in 2020. In January 2020, Templeman started his first mini-tour, with first performing at Headrow House in Leeds, on the 17th January, before selling out his first London headline show at Colours, Hoxton. His 2020 single "Happiness in Liquid Form" was added to rotation on Australian youth broadcaster Triple J. Templeman's 2020 single "Forever Isn't Long Enough" was released on 28 September 2020, and launched with a third consecutive Annie Mac's Hottest Record in the World on BBC Radio 1. Templeman singles "Happiness in Liquid Form" and "Obvious Guy" both earned a space on the Radio 1 C List.

In an interview with Headliner Magazine in 2021, Templeman said of his single "Everybody's Gonna Love Somebody": “I'm just doing it in my room; I'm a normal bloke just making a bit of a tune. It's literally just been me messing around, really; I'm not a professional at it at all. I just know how to piece it together enough to make it not sound like a bunch of noise!"

In November 2020, he was shortlisted as a finalist for MTV Push UK & IRE 2021 for best upcoming artists.

On 3 November 2021, Templeman released the single "3D Feelings", produced by Justin Young of The Vaccines. This was followed by the release of "Broken" in 2022, alongside the announcement of his debut studio album, Mellow Moon, which was released on 27 May through Chess Club Records.

Personal life 
In 2019, he was hospitalised and then diagnosed with childhood interstitial lung disease. In 2021, he opened up about his experiences with depression and anxiety.

In July 2020, Templeman signed an open letter, to the UK Equalities minister Liz Truss, calling for a ban on all forms of LGBT+ conversion therapy.

Discography

Studio albums

Mini-albums

Extended plays 
{| class="wikitable plainrowheaders" style="text-align:center;"
|+List of EPs released, with release date and label shown
! scope="col" rowspan="2"| Title
! scope="col" rowspan="2"| Details
! scope="col" colspan="2"| Peak chartpositions
|-
! scope="col" style="width:3em;font-size:85%;"| UKIndie
! scope="col" style="width:3em;font-size:85%;"| SCO
|-
! scope="row"| Wonderland Dreamin'''
|
 Released: 1 August 2017
 Label: Self-released
 Format: Digital download
| — || —
|-
! scope="row"| Dazed Days|
 Released: 25 October 2017
 Label: Self-released
 Format: Digital download
| — || —
|-
! scope="row"| 5th Avenue Revisited|
 Released: 2 March 2018
 Label: Self-released
 Format: Digital download
| — || —
|-
! scope="row"| Like an Animal|
 Released: 18 October 2018
 Label: Chess Club
 Format: Vinyl, digital download, streaming
| — || —
|-
! scope="row"| Sunday Morning Cereal| 
 Released: 21 June 2019
 Label: Chess Club
 Formats: Vinyl, digital download, streaming
| — || —
|-
! scope="row"| Don't Go Wasting Time|
 Released: 13 November 2019
 Label: Chess Club
 Formats: Vinyl, digital download, streaming
| — || —
|-
! scope="row"| Happiness in Liquid Form|
 Released: 17 July 2020
 Label: Chess Club
 Formats: Vinyl, digital download, streaming
| 22 || 84
|-
| colspan="4" style="text-align:center; font-size:85%;"| "—" denotes a recording that did not chart or was not released.
|}

Singles
As lead artist

As a featured artist

 Festival appearances 

Awards and nominations

References

Notes
 All releases prior to Orange Juice'' were removed from streaming platforms at an unknown date, presumably shortly before or after its release. However, these EPs were subsequently re-uploaded to Bandcamp in 2020, and therefore they are regarded as official releases.

Living people
2003 births
English male singer-songwriters
People from Bedfordshire
English pop musicians